Weed Land: Inside America's Marijuana Epicenter and How Pot Went Legit is a non-fiction book about cannabis by Peter Hecht, published by University of California Press in March 2014. The book's first chapter covers the Drug Enforcement Administration's raid of the Wo/Men's Alliance for Medical Marijuana in Santa Cruz, California.

See also
 List of books about cannabis

References

2014 non-fiction books
American non-fiction books
Non-fiction books about cannabis
University of California Press books